64 Field Regiment is part of the Regiment of Artillery of the Indian Army.

Formation 
The regiment was raised in Belgaum on 18 July 1962 under Lieutenant Colonel Bhag Singh Jaswal as 64 Mountain Regiment.

Composition
The unit is the only pure Gorkha artillery regiment in the Indian Army. Unlike other artillery regiments, the gunners wear the Gorkha hat instead of the navy blue beret.

Operations
The regiment has taken part in the following operations –
Sino-Indian War: The regiment fought at Bomdila in North-East Frontier Agency.
  Indo-Pakistani War of 1971: The regiment under the command of Lieutenant Colonel Dharam Pall Dhillon participated in the north western sector of erstwhile East Pakistan during the war. It was equipped with 75/24 Pack Howitzers and was under 20 Mountain Artillery Brigade of the 20 Mountain Division. It took part in the battles of Gobindoganj and Bogra.

 Counter insurgency operations in Jammu and Kashmir

Honours and awards
During the 1971 war, Captain Surjit Singh Parmar of the regiment earned a Vir Chakra. Lieutenant Colonel Dharam Pall Dhillon and Captain Naresh Kumar Srivastava were mentioned in dispatches.
The regiment was awarded the GOC-in-C (South Western Command) unit citation in 2014.  
COAS Commendation Card

War cry
The war cry of the regiment is सबै भंदा पहिला, सबै भंदा राम्रो (Hindi = सबसे पहले, सबसे अच्छा) which translates to ‘Always First, Always Best’.

See also
List of artillery regiments of Indian Army

References

Military units and formations established in 1962
Artillery regiments of the Indian Army after 1947